Tomorrow's Another Day is a 2011 documentary about Swedish film director Roy Andersson and his unique way of making films. Shot during the four-year-long filming Andersson's 2007 film You, the Living, the documentary is a personal description of a surprising and different approach to the creative process. Roy Andersson has invented a working method of his own in order to achieve control over the work in process, but he is ultimately dependent on his young co-workers.

The film was released in April 2011. A shorter version of the film has been shown at the Museum of Modern Art, in New York United States of America.

External links
 
 www.royandersson.com/nyheter.html
 www.moma.org/visit/calendar/film_screenings/7458
 

Autobiographical documentary films
2011 films
Swedish documentary films
2010s Swedish-language films
2011 documentary films
2010s Swedish films